Konstantin Bernhard von Voigts-Rhetz (16 July 1809 – 14 April 1877) was a Prussian general who served in the Austro-Prussian War and the Franco-Prussian War.

Biography
Voights-Rhetz was born in Seesen in the Duchy of Brunswick, then part of the short-lived Kingdom of Westphalia. He entered the Adolfinum-Gymnasium in Bückeburg at the age of 10, and would excel in math, science, history and geography. Voigts-Rhetz entered the Prussian 9th Infantry Regiment in 1827 and was made an officer in 1829. Between 1833 and 1835 Voigts-Rhetz attended the Prussian Military Academy. In 1837 he was attached to the topography division. He joined the General Staff in 1839 and was promoted to captain in 1841 and major in 1847.

Voigts-Rhetz joined the staff of the V Corps in 1847. When revolutions broke out in 1848 he helped suppress the insurrection in Posen. After the insurrection was quelled Voigts-Rhetz engaged in a dispute with the royal commissioner for Posen, General Karl Wilhelm von Willisen. Both Voigts-Rhetz and Willisen used the press to justify their actions.

In 1852 Voigts-Rhetz became chief of staff of the V Corps. After being promoted to colonel in 1855 he was given command of the 9th Infantry Brigade in 1858, with the rank of a major-general. In 1859 he became a director in the Prussian War ministry. In 1860 he was given command of the Fortress of the German Confederation in Luxembourg. In 1863 he was promoted to lieutenant-general and given command of the 7th Infantry Division. In 1864 he became commander in chief of the garrison at Frankfurt am Main.

During the Austro-Prussian War Voigts-Rhetz served as chief of staff of the First Army, led by Prince Friedrich Karl of Prussia. Voights-Rhetz was an opinionated soldier and critical of Chief of Staff Helmuth von Moltke, however was intelligent and courageous. In this function he contributed to the Prussian victories at Münchengrätz, Gitschin and Sadowa. After the war he was made governor-general of the newly annexed Province of Hanover and commander of the newly established X Corps.

During the Franco-Prussian War Voigts-Rhetz's X Corps became part of the 2nd Army, again led by Prince Friedrich Karl. With these troops Voigts-Rhetz took part in the battles at Mars-la-Tour and Gravelotte. After Gravelotte, X Corps was part of the troops besieging Metz. After the fall of Metz Voigts-Rhetz and X Corps were sent to the Loire, where he was victorious at Beaune-la-Rolande. After the end of the war he remained in command of the Corps until he retired in 1873 due to health reasons. He was given a donation of 150.000 thalers for his services during the war.

Honours and awards

German States 
  Kingdom of Prussia:
 Knight of the Order of the Red Eagle, 3rd Class with Bow and Swords, 1848; Grand Cross with Oak Leaves and Swords on Ring, 2 September 1873
 Service Award Cross
 Knight of Honour of the Johanniter Order, 1852; Knight of Justice, 1867
 Pour le Mérite (military), 11 September 1866; with Oak Leaves, 31 December 1870
 Iron Cross (1870), 1st Class with 2nd Class on Black Band
 Grand Commander's Cross of the Royal House Order of Hohenzollern, in Diamonds and with Swords, 16 June 1871
 Knight of the Order of the Black Eagle, 11 December 1873
  Duchy of Anhalt: Grand Cross of the House Order of Albert the Bear, 10 October 1864
 : Grand Cross of the Order of Henry the Lion, with Swords
    Ernestine duchies: Commander of the Saxe-Ernestine House Order, 2nd Class, July 1858
   Lippe: Cross of Honour of the House Order of Lippe, 2nd Class
 : Military Merit Cross, 1st Class
 : Grand Cross of the House and Merit Order of Duke Peter Friedrich Ludwig, with Swords, 18 June 1869

Foreign Orders 
 :
 Knight of the Order of St. George, 4th Class, December 1870
 Knight of the Order of St. Anna, 1st Class

Literature
Howard, Michael, The Franco-Prussian War: The German Invasion of France 1870–1871, New York: Routledge, 2001. .

Wawro, Geoffrey, The Franco-Prussian War: The German Conquest of France in 1870-1871, Cambridge University Press, 2005, 

Wawro, Geoffrey, The Austro-Prussian War: Austria's War with Prussia and Italy in 1866, Cambridge University Press, 1997,

References

1809 births
1877 deaths
People from Seesen
German military personnel of the Franco-Prussian War
Prussian people of the Austro-Prussian War
Generals of Infantry (Prussia)
Recipients of the Pour le Mérite (military class)
Recipients of the Iron Cross (1870), 1st class
Recipients of the Military Merit Cross (Mecklenburg-Schwerin), 1st class
Recipients of the Order of St. George of the Fourth Degree
Recipients of the Order of St. Anna, 1st class
Member of the Prussian National Assembly
Military personnel from Lower Saxony